The 1976 United States Senate election in Maryland took place on November 2, 1976. Incumbent Republican U.S. Senator Glenn Beall Jr. ran for re-election to a second term, but was defeated by Democratic challenger Paul Sarbanes.

Major candidates

Democratic
Paul Sarbanes, U.S. Representative since 1971
Joseph Tydings, former Senator

Republican
John Glenn Beall Jr., incumbent U.S. Senator since 1971

Results

Results by county

Counties that flipped from Republican to Democrat
Anne Arundel
Baltimore (County)
Calvert
Cecil
Charles
Dorchester
Harford
Howard
Kent
Queen Anne's
Somerset
St. Mary's
Wicomico

See also
1976 United States Senate elections
1976 United States elections

References

Notes

1976
Maryland
United States Senate